Simeon Gannett Reed (April 23, 1830 – November 7, 1895) was an American businessman and entrepreneur in Oregon.  A native of Massachusetts, he made a fortune primarily in the transportation sector in association with William S. Ladd. Reed is the namesake for Reedville, Oregon, and Reed College in Portland, Oregon.

Early life
Simeon Gannett Reed was born on April 23, 1830, in East Abington, Massachusetts. He was born into a wealthy family and received his education at a private academy, graduating when he was 13 years old. After working and training as an apprentice in several vocations, he married Amanda Woods at the age of 20, with the couple not having any children. Woods was 18 at the time and a distant cousin of John Quincy Adams.

When he was 22, he collected supplies to sell in California and sailed there, setting up a store in a tent in Sacramento, while Amanda remained back east. Reed sold his goods and grain to the gold miners, but decided to relocate to what was then the Oregon Territory after a few trips there to purchase supplies.

Oregon
Late in 1852, Reed started a mercantile in Rainier, Oregon, along the Columbia River downstream from Portland. After a short time, he relocated to Portland and became friends with William S. Ladd, a local merchant. In 1854, Amanda sailed to San Francisco to reunite with Reed, and accompanied Caroline Ames Elliott, Ladd's sweetheart who he married in San Francisco. In 1855, Reed became a clerk for Ladd, and in 1859 he became a partner in the company, which was then known as Ladd, Reed, & Co.

In May 1860, Reed, Jacob Kamm, and John C. Ainsworth founded the Oregon Steam Navigation Company, a conglomerate of several river shipping companies plying the Columbia and Willamette rivers. Reed held 128 shares in the company, which even during the economic depression of 1873 produced $300,000 in dividends. Reed was also vice president of the firm. He built a mansion at First and Harrison streets in 1868, where the other wealthy residents were also constructing large homes.

In April 1880, the Oregon Steam Navigation Company merged with the companies of Henry Villard and Ben Holladay to form the Oregon Railway and Navigation Company.  This created a single transportation conglomerate encompassing river shipping, stagecoach, and railroad ventures. Reed focused his energy now on meeting the demand for steel he anticipated due to Villard's Northern Pacific railroad. But Reed's Oregon Iron and Steel Company at Oswego suffered a lack of investment and never started production of the steel rails Reed expected; Reed lost half a million dollars in the venture.

Death and legacy
On November 7, 1895, Simeon Reed died while in California at his retirement home. His estate, worth millions of dollars, was left to Amanda, with instructions to use it to assist in the cultural and intellectual development of Portland. Amanda died in 1904 without much progress towards Simeon's instructions.

In 1908, Amanda's estate established Reed College in Portland. William M. Ladd (son of Reed's former partner William S. Ladd) provided the lands on which the college stands today, and almost all of Reed's estate was passed on to the college, Reed having left no heirs. Simeon and Amanda Reed are buried near the family plot of Jacob Kamm in Portland's River View Cemetery.

Reed Street, in Northwest Portland, is named for him.

References

External links
 

1830 births
1895 deaths
Businesspeople from Portland, Oregon
Reed College people
19th-century American businesspeople